Victor Lewis MBE (29 July 1919 – 9 February 2009) was a British jazz guitarist and bandleader. He also enjoyed success as an artists' agent and manager.

Biography
He was born in London, England. Lewis began playing the guitar at the age of three, and dabbled with cornet and trombone. One of his early bands included George Shearing, then a teenager, among its members. Lewis first toured the United States in 1938, where he did recording sessions with a band that had Bobby Hackett, Eddie Condon, and Pee Wee Russell among its members. He served in the Royal Air Force from 1941 to 1944; during this time he recorded with Buddy Featherstonhaugh. He worked with Stephane Grappelli during 1944-45 and with Ted Heath soon after. While he was in the RAF, he met Jack Parnell and together they formed the "Vic Lewis/Jack Parnell Jazzmen".

Lewis put together his first big band in 1946 to play swing jazz, but soon after its formation Lewis began to direct the ensemble toward the sound of Stan Kenton. Kenton provided Lewis with some of his arrangements by Pete Rugolo, Gerry Mulligan, and Bill Holman. Lewis's pianist, Ken Thorne, also made arranging contributions. Lewis toured the US with the band at various intervals between 1956 and 1959, and recorded extensively for Parlophone, Esquire, Decca, and Philips. After 1959, Lewis semi-retired as a performer, he only occasionally recorded, but he continued to write about jazz and champion its value. He went into artist management, and oversaw the careers of photographer Robert Whitaker and the singer Cilla Black among many others.

In 1964, Lewis sold his management agency to Brian Epstein's company NEMS, and thereafter worked with Epstein on arranging the Beatles' international tours. Following Epstein's death in 1967, Lewis served as managing director of NEMS.

As a keen cricketer and administrator, he founded his own cricket club and represented the United States at the International Cricket Council. He served as a General Committee Member of Middlesex County Cricket Club between 1976 and 2001. Lewis also managed Robin Gibb of the Bee Gees, and Lewis produced Gibb's debut album Robin's Reign released in 1970.

Lewis also had a foot in the door of more serious music and conducted recordings of his own and others with the Royal Philharmonic Orchestra on Vocalion, which included excerpts from his Russian Suite, a Romance for Violin, and two movements (Red and Jade) from a multi-composer suite called Colours.  He was awarded the MBE in 2007.

Personal life and death
Lewis married Jill Anstey in 1950. An autobiography, Music and Maiden Overs: My Showbusiness Life (written with the publicist Tony Barrow) was published in 1987. He also collaborated with Robert Feather on a volume of photographs, My Life in Jazz (2007). He died in 2009. His wife having predeceased him, he was survived by daughter Dannie and granddaughter Jasmine.

Discography
 Vic Lewis Plays Bossa Nova at Home and Away (His Master's Voice, 1963)
 Plays the Songs of the Beatles (DJM Silverline, 1973)
 In Concert (Hep, 1978)
 Tea Break (Concept, 1985)
 Vic Lewis Big Bands (Concept, 1988)
 Presents a Celebration of West Coast Jazz (Candid, 1994)
 The Project with Andy Martin (Drewbone, 2004)

References

External links
Scott Yanow, [ Vic Lewis] at Allmusic

1919 births
2009 deaths
English jazz bandleaders
English jazz guitarists
English male guitarists
Royal Air Force personnel of World War II
Candid Records artists
Robin Gibb
20th-century British guitarists
British male jazz musicians
Hep Records artists
20th-century British male musicians